Curt Haagers -87 is a 1986 Curt Haagers studio album. The backside of the album cover contained the band's planned 1987 performance dates.

Track listing

Side A
Häng med mej på party (My Tool Tool) - 2.17
En silverslant för dina tankar (Say You'll Stay Until Tomorrow) - 3.05
Ta mej till havet - 3.25
Köp en ros - 3.15
Roses of Pic Kardy - 2.35 (instrumental)
Vilken härlig morgon (Hallo, Guten Morgen) - 3.25
Jag vill vakna upp med dej (I Want to Wake Up with You)

Side B 
Macken - 2.30
Vägen till en vän (That's What Friends are for) - 3.15
Venedigs ros - 3.05
Amapola - 4.09 (instrumental)
Tur i kärlek (Good Luck Charm) - 2.35
Sommarminnen - 3.40
Där björkarna susa - 2.43

Contributors 
Producer: Lars O. Karlsson
Sveriges Radios Symfoniorkester
Choir: Liza Öhman, Lotta Engberg, Lars Westman
Recorded and mixed: Studio Bohus, Kungälv, Sweden and KMH-studion, Stockholm, Sweden, late 1986
cover design: Fri Reklam
Production: Mariann Records, 1986

References 

1986 albums
Curt Haagers albums